Roy Francis Ferguson Flatt (4 September 1947 – 13 March 2011) was an English clergyman who was ordained as a priest in the Scottish Episcopal Church, and served in the Diocese of Argyll and The Isles.

Born in Bury St Edmunds in 1947  and educated at King Edward VI Grammar School, Bury St Edmunds and the University of Strathclyde, Glasgow, he was ordained in 1981 and began his career with a curacy in Pittenweem, Fife. He was then Diocesan Secretary of Argyll and The Isles and later its Dean–-a post he held from 1999 to 2005. He was the Incumbent at Inverary. He died on 13 March 2011.

Notes

1947 births
2011 deaths
Clergy from Bury St Edmunds
People educated at King Edward VI School, Bury St Edmunds
Alumni of the University of Strathclyde
Scottish Episcopalian priests
Deans of Argyll and The Isles